Reddyanus petrzelkai is a species of scorpion in the family Buthidae.

References

Animals described in 2003
petrzelkai